Hla Myint Than  also Hla Myint (born 26 December    1964) is a Burmese politician and  currently serving as an Amyotha Hluttaw MP for Mon State No. 11 constituency. He is a member of the National League for Democracy.

Early life and education
Hla Myint Than was born on 26 December 1964 in Kyaikto, Mon State, Myanmar. He graduated with B.Sc., H.G.P, R.L from Mawlamyaing University and Yangon University. He served as the chairman of NLD Bago. He is a member of central campaign Department of Bago Township and also a member of the center Peasant Affairs Committee.

Political career
He is a member of the National League for Democracy. In the 2015 Myanmar general election, he was elected as an Amyotha Hluttaw MP and elected representative from Mon State No. 11 parliamentary constituency.

References

National League for Democracy politicians
1964 births
Living people
People from Mon State